Wachau or Wachow (Upper Sorbian) is a municipality in the district of Bautzen in Saxony, Germany. This is known for one of many battles around Leipzig in the Napoleonic Wars, especially the Sixth coalition against France.

References 

Populated places in Bautzen (district)